Ralliement national (RN) (in English: "National Rally") was a separatist and right-wing populist provincial political party that advocated the political independence of Quebec from Canada in the 1960s.

The party was led by former créditiste Gilles Grégoire. Unlike the Rassemblement pour l'indépendance nationale led by Pierre Bourgault, a left-wing party, the Ralliement national was more right of centre on the political spectrum.

The Ralliement national was formed in 1966 following a merger between the Regroupement national (a dissident wing of Bourgault's RIN) and a pro-independence group that broke away from the Ralliement des créditistes in 1965.

In the 1966 Quebec general election, the Ralliement national and the Rassemblement pour l'indépendance nationale won about 8.8% of the popular vote and no seats.

In 1968, the Ralliement national agreed to merge with René Lévesque's Mouvement souveraineté-association to form the Parti Québécois under Lévesque's leadership.

After that, Pierre Bourgault disbanded the RIN and invited its members to join the new PQ. At that point, sovereigntist forces in Quebec were united, and three elections later, the PQ won the 1976 Quebec general election, with historic consequences.

Election results

See also
 Politics of Quebec
 List of Quebec general elections
 List of Quebec premiers
 List of Quebec leaders of the Opposition
 National Assembly of Quebec
 Timeline of Quebec history
 Political parties in Quebec
 Secessionist movements of Canada

References

External links
 National Assembly historical information
 La Politique québécoise sur le Web

Provincial political parties in Quebec
Defunct secessionist organizations in Canada
Defunct political parties in Canada
Political parties established in 1966